Coscinia liouvillei is a moth of the family Erebidae. It was described by Ferdinand Le Cerf in 1928. It is found in Morocco.

Taxonomy
The species is alternatively listed as a subspecies of Coscinia libyssa.

References

Callimorphina
Moths described in 1928